St Margarets is a village and civil parish  west of Hereford, in the county of Herefordshire, England. The parish includes the hamlet of Upper Maes-coed. In 2011 the parish had a population of 180. The parish touches Abbey Dore, Bacton, Dulas, Longtown, Michaelchurch Escley, Newton, Peterchurch, Turnastone and Vowchurch. St Margarets shares a parish council with Michaelchurch Escley, Newton, Turnastone and Vowchurch called "Vowchurch and District Group Parish Council".

Landmarks 
There are 19 listed buildings in St Margarets. St Margarets has a church called St Margaret's that displays a plaque in the memento mori tradition in Welsh with the words Karka dy ddiwwedd ("remember your end"), dated 1574.

History 
The placename is recent even though the church dates to the 12th century.

References

External links 

 

Villages in Herefordshire
Civil parishes in Herefordshire